Mathieu Duhamel (born 12 July 1984) is a retired French professional footballer who played for as a striker. A former graduate of the Clairefontaine academy, he has played for a host of semi-professional and amateur clubs before securing a move to professional club Troyes ahead of the 2010–11 season.

Career
Born in Mont-Saint-Aignan, Duhamel started his career at US Quevilly. In 1997, he was selected to attend the Clairefontaine academy and, while training at the academy's facilities during the weekdays, trained at a local Parisian club on the weekends. Duhamel also at a stint at the youth academy of FC Rouen. After departing Clairefontaine, he returned to Quevilly and spent three seasons on the club's senior team amassing 22 appearances in the Championnat de France amateur. In 2006, he returned to Rouen and scored 12 goals in 26 appearances during his one season at the club. His season at Rouen led to Duhamel signing with Championnat National club SO Romorantin.

The following season, Duhamel joined Stade Lavallois and recorded 11 goals in 22 appearances. His performances helped the club achieve promotion to Ligue 2. He was, however, not retained by the club and remained in the third division after signing with US Créteil-Lusitanos. While at Créteil, Duhamel had his best season to date appearing in 26 matches and scoring 17 goals, fourth-best in the league.

On 10 June 2010, after a successful campaign with Créteil, Duhamel joined Championnat National club Troyes on a three-year contract.

On 23 December 2010, he signed on a season-long loan deal with Ligue 2 side FC Metz before the end of the 2010–11 campaign. Six months after the loan deal became a permanent deal.

On 20 August 2015, Duhamel signed for Ligue 2 club Le Havre.

In 2017 he moved to Ligue 2 side Quevilly-Rouen.

On 15 January 2018, he was signed by Italian Serie B club  Foggia.

Duhamel returned to France for the 2018–19 season, signing with Régional 1 side Grand-Quevilly FC. After two years with the club, during which time they were promoted to, and relegated from, Championnat National 3, he signed for AS Beauvais Oise in Championnat National 2. In June 2021, he joined Romilly-Pont Saint Pierre FC. A year later, he joined Régional 3 side FC Saint-Julien and also announced, that he would retire at the end of the 2022-23 season.

References

External links
 
 

1984 births
Living people
French footballers
French expatriate footballers
People from Mont-Saint-Aignan
Association football forwards
Ligue 1 players
Ligue 2 players
Championnat National players
Championnat National 2 players
Championnat National 3 players
Le Havre AC players
Stade Lavallois players
US Quevilly-Rouen Métropole players
FC Rouen players
US Créteil-Lusitanos players
ES Troyes AC players
FC Metz players
SO Romorantin players
Stade Malherbe Caen players
Thonon Evian Grand Genève F.C. players
Calcio Foggia 1920 players
AS Beauvais Oise players
Serie B players
French expatriate sportspeople in Italy
Expatriate footballers in Italy
Sportspeople from Seine-Maritime
Footballers from Normandy